Zoltán Soós-Ruszka Hradetzky (16 April 1902 – 8 July 1992) was a Hungarian sport shooter who competed at the 1932 Summer Olympics and 1936 Summer Olympics. In 1932 he won the bronze medal in the 50 metre rifle, prone competition.

References

External links
 

1902 births
1992 deaths
Hungarian male sport shooters
Olympic shooters of Hungary
Shooters at the 1932 Summer Olympics
Shooters at the 1936 Summer Olympics
Olympic bronze medalists for Hungary
Olympic medalists in shooting
Medalists at the 1932 Summer Olympics
Sport shooters from Budapest
20th-century Hungarian people